The Michigan Regional Sports Network is an online sports radio network based in Flint, Michigan. The station debuted on August 25, 2008. The station presently serves as the home network of:
 Southeast Michigan high school sports
 Mott Community College Sports
 Local and national sports
 London Mustangs of the Ontario Junior Football League
 Saginaw Swan Valley Sports
MRSN is also an affiliate of Sports USA, which broadcasts the NFL and NCAA. MRSN is the State of Michigan's affiliate station for the Ontario Hockey League's Erie Otters.

References

External links 

 Michigan Regional Sports Network

Sports television networks in the United States